Alexander Davidson may refer to:

Alex Davidson (Australian footballer) (1876–1951), Australian rules football player
Alex Davidson (footballer, born 1920) (1920–2005), Scottish footballer
Alex Davidson (footballer, born 1878) (1878–1929), Scottish footballer
Alex Davidson (rugby league) (born 1992), English rugby league player
Alexander C. Davidson (1826–1897), U.S. Representative from Alabama
Alexander Davidson (architect) (1839–1908), Scottish architect
Alexander Dyce Davidson, Church of Scotland minister
Alexander Dyce Davidson (professor) (1835–1886), Scottish academic and surgeon

See also
Alexander Davison (disambiguation)